Apotek 1 is a large pharmacy chain in Norway, owned by Apotek 1 Gruppen AS with more than 400 outlets all over Norway. The chain was established in 1999, expanded massively since the deregulation in 2001, and now has a 40% market share.

References

External links 

 Official page

Norwegian pharmacy brands
Retail companies of Norway
Retail companies established in 1999
1999 establishments in Norway
Companies based in Lørenskog